Russell Lance Fairfax (born 29 March 1952, Sydney, New South Wales) is an Australian former Rugby Union and Rugby League player. A precocious talent, he played his first rugby international while still at school. Having played eight tests for the Wallabies, he moved to Rugby League's Eastern Suburbs Roosters in 1974. Following his retirement from Rugby League, Fairfax coached in the 1989 and 1990 seasons.

Early life
Russell Fairfax, whose father was in the Australian Army, grew up in Sorrento, Victoria, where he played Australian football. The family moved to Ipswich, Queensland, where he played rugby league, before moving to Sydney.

Fairfax attended Matraville High School and played for La Perouse and Alexandria Rovers rugby league clubs in his junior years, before joining the Randwick club to play rugby union. Playing at fullback he represented Australian Schools on their tours of South Africa (1969) and New Zealand (1970).

Football career 

From 1971-73, Fairfax played in eight rugby union tests for Australia.

In 1974, the  joined Eastern Suburbs rugby league club and was an instant sensation in the new code. His unorthodox play and long blonde flowing locks made him a crowd favourite. Fairfax played in 115 matches for Easts and won premierships with that club in 1974 and 1975. Fairfax represented both Sydney and NSW during his career but a broken leg suffered during the height of his career in the 1975 season probably prevented him from playing for Australia also in that rugby code. During the 1976 NSWRFL season, Fairfax played at fullback in the unofficial 1976 World Club Challenge match against British champions St. Helens in Sydney.

Fairfax played the final season of his career - 1981, with the South Sydney club and went on to coach the Snowy River Bears in Group 16.

Fairfax had an unsuccessful stint in coaching at the Eastern Suburbs Roosters in 1989 and 1990.

Other roles 

During the 1970s (prior to becoming a full-time professional player), Fairfax taught physical education at Randwick North High School and Cleveland Street High School.

After retiring from football, Fairfax had a long career in sports journalism with Fox Sports.

At the 2017 local government elections, Fairfax stood as an Independent councillor for Randwick City Council.

Personal life 

Fairfax is married with two children. In 2014 he had a serious brain injury that required intensive surgery from which he recovered, but had some memory and personality effects.

References

1952 births
Living people
People educated at Matraville Sports High School
Australia international rugby union players
Australian rugby league coaches
Australian rugby league commentators
Australian rugby league journalists
Australian sports journalists
New South Wales rugby league team players
Rugby league fullbacks
Rugby league players from Sydney
Rugby union players from Sydney
South Sydney Rabbitohs players
Sportsmen from New South Wales
Sydney Roosters coaches
Sydney Roosters players
Rugby union fullbacks
People from Sorrento, Victoria